Sevenes is a 2011 Malayalam-language sports-action film written by Ikbal Kuttipuram and directed by Joshiy. The cast includes Kunchacko Boban, Asif Ali, Nivin Pauly,  Rejith Menon, Aju Varghese, and Vineeth Kumar in lead roles; and Nadia Moidu, Rima Kallingal and Bhama in supporting roles. The film centres on seven young men who play sevens football, popular in Malabar. The film started its shooting in April 2011 at Kozhikode district.

Plot 
Shyam, with his six other friends including Suraj, Shaukath, Arun, Linto, Vijeesh and Sharath, who always play together in their 'Sevens' team. In an attempt to cement their place in the more famous 'Kozhikode strikers club', they take on an opponent player Aravindan on the field, leading him to serious head injuries. Gravely hurt by the plight of Aravindan, they now try to arrange the necessary amount for his surgery by taking up a `quotation' which was brought to them by a broker named Habib. As days go by, they come across fresher financial problems for which they go on doing the same and in between take part inadvertently in the homicide of the son of a mafia king. And within hours, the hunters now turn to be the ones being hunted by the mafia dons ruling the city.

Cast

Music 
The film score and soundtrack were composed by Bijibal. The soundtrack consists of three tracks, including one theme music track, with lyrics penned by Rafeeq Ahamed and Santhosh Varma.

 Track listing

References

External links 
 

2010s Malayalam-language films
2011 action films
2011 films
Indian action films
Indian association football films
Sports action films
Films shot in Kozhikode
Films directed by Joshiy